Albert Edward Bailey (11 June 1868 – 30 March 1953), better known as Bert Bailey,  was a New Zealand-born Australian playwright, theatrical manager and stage and screen actor best known for playing Dad Rudd, in both mediums, the character from the books penned by Steele Rudd.

Early life
Bailey was born in Auckland, New Zealand, the second son of farmer Christopher Bailey and Harriette Adelaide. His parents divorced and Bailey's mother moved with him to Sydney when he was six months old. She remarried in 1879 and went on to become a noted retailer, establishing the firm McCathie's.

Bailey was educated at Crown Street School and Cleveland Street Public School. He decided not to go into the family business and worked as a telegram boy and at a floor manager at Crystal Palace skating rink. At age fifteen he went into vaudeville as a tambourine player and vocalist at Canterbury Music Hall in George Street, Sydney.

In 1889 he joined the touring theatrical company of Edmund Duggan, playing a wide variety of roles throughout Australia. In 1900 he and Duggan joined the company of noted theatre producer William Anderson, who was Duggan's brother-in-law.

Playwriting career
In 1907 Bailey and Duggan wrote a play together under the joint pseudonym of "Albert Edmunds", The Squatter's Daughter (1907).  This was produced by Anderson to great success and was adapted into a film in 1910, which Bailey directed as well as appeared in.

He and Duggan collaborated on a number of follow up plays (with both men also acting in the productions), including The Man from Outback (1909), On Our Selection (1912), an adaptation of the stories of Steele Rudd and The Native Born (1913). Of these the most popular was On Our Selection which became an Australian theatrical phenomenon, with over hundreds of productions through to the present day. Bailey would perform the role of Dad Rudd on and off for the rest of his career.

Theatre entrepreneur
In 1912 Bailey ended his 12-year association with Anderson and went into partnership with his business manager, Julius Grant. The two of them leased the Anderson Theatre in Melbourne and formed a highly successful association as theatre producers. Bailey also frequently toured with the 'Bert Bailey Dramatic Company'. He and Grant did suffer some commercial failures, such as a season of plays by William Shakespeare and a 1920 production of On Our Selection in London.

After touring in the Barry Conners play The Patsy for 23 weeks in 1929, Bailey retired from performing, believing that talking films were making theatre unprofitable.

Film career
Bailey was brought out of retirement in 1932 by Stuart F. Doyle to play Dad Rudd in a film version of On Our Selection, which he also co-wrote. He received £400 plus 60% of the profits which, for that movie, came to an estimated £14,000 by the end of 1934.

Bailey played Dad Rudd in three more films, contributing to the script as well for each film. All four Rudd films were directed by Ken G. Hall who also directed an adaptation of The Squatter's Daughter. After Dad Rudd, MP (1940), Bailey retired for good, apart from a brief appearance in a propaganda short made for the war effort, South West Pacific (1943).

Personal life
Bailey married fellow actor Ivy Gorrick in 1902 and they had one child, a daughter, Doreen. His wife died in 1932 and Bailey never remarried. His habits included lawn bowls, boating and travelling with his daughter.

In 1937 it was estimated that Bailey had earned £200,000 from On Our Selection. He died a wealthy man with an estate worth £32,527.

Filmography
 The Squatter's Daughter (1910) – original play, actor, director
 The Christian (1911) – actor
 On Our Selection (1932) – actor, co-writer, original play
 The Squatter's Daughter (1933) – original play only
 Grandad Rudd (1935) – actor, co-writer
 Dad and Dave Come to Town – actor, co-writer
 Dad Rudd, MP (1940) – actor, co-writer
 South West Pacific (1943) – actor

Select theatre credits

Criterion Comedy Burlesque Opera (1895) – actor in tour around New South Wales
True Til Death (1896) – actor
Harbour Lights (1896) – actor
The Profligate (1896) – actor
The American Girl or, A Play Without a Plot (1898) - actor
The World Against Her (1898) – actor
The Southern Cross (1898) – actor
East Lynne (1899) – actor
The Ladder of Life – actor
The Squatter's Daughter, or, The Land of the Wattle (1907) – actor, co-writer
White Australia or, The Empty North (1909) – actor
The Man from Outback (1909) – co-writer, actor
The Bushwoman (1909)
The Winning Ticket (1910) – actor
The Christian (1911)
My Mate (1911) – actor
On Our Selection (1912) – actor, co-writer, producer
The Native Born (1913) – co-writer, actor, producer
What Happened to Mary (1914) – actor, producer
The Ninety-Nine (1914) – producer
Duncan McClure and the Poor Parson (1916) and (1918) – actor, producer, co-writer
Gran’dad Rudd (1918) – producer, co-writer
On Our Selection (1920) – London production – actor
Jefferson Wins Through the King (1921) – producer
The Sentimental Bloke (1922–23) – producer, actor (as Ginger Mick)
The Patsy (1929) – actor

References

External links
 
Bert Bailey at Live Performance of Australia Hall of Fame
 Bert Bailey at Australian Dictionary of Biography
 Bert Bailey at Australian Postal History
 Bert Bailey Australian theatre credits at AusStage
 Bert Bailey at National Film and Sound Archive
 Bert Bailey's papers at National Library of Australia

Australian male stage actors
Australian male film actors
New Zealand male film actors
New Zealand male stage actors
1868 births
1953 deaths
Actors from Auckland
20th-century Australian male actors
Male actors from Sydney
New Zealand emigrants to Australia
Australian male dramatists and playwrights